Jokūbas Gintvainis (born 25 July 1994) is a professional Lithuanian basketball player for Nevėžis Kėdaniai of the Lithuanian Basketball League. He plays for point guard and shooting guard positions.

International career 
Gintvainis won silver medal while representing the Lithuanian U-16 National Team during the 2010 FIBA Europe Under-16 Championship.

References

External links
Jokubas Gintvainis at fiba.com

1994 births
Living people
Bàsquet Manresa players
BC Lietkabelis players
BC Nevėžis players
BC Pieno žvaigždės players
CB Peñas Huesca players
Liga ACB players
Lithuanian expatriate basketball people in Spain
Lithuanian men's basketball players
Point guards
Science City Jena players
Shooting guards
Sportspeople from Plungė